Les Rita Mitsouko (translation: The Rita Mitsukos) were a French pop rock group formed by Fred Chichin and Catherine Ringer. The duo first performed as Rita Mitsouko at Gibus Club in Paris in 1980. They went on to become one of the most acclaimed musical acts in France. "Marcia Baila", their debut single produced by Conny Plank, went to number 2 in the French singles chart in 1984. They then started a collaboration with producer Tony Visconti on two albums: the No Comprendo and  Marc & Robert. "Singing in the Shower", sung as a duet with Sparks, was a commercial success in France and was then heavily played on US dance radio stations in 1988. Iggy Pop also collaborated with them on 1993's Système D, duetting with Ringer on "My Love Is Bad".

Chichin died from cancer in 2007. Instead of continuing as Les Rita Mitsouko, Ringer completed a final tour, "Catherine Ringer chante Les Rita Mitsouko and more" (Catherine Ringer sings Les Rita Mitsouko and more), and started a solo career.

History 
The duet has stated that the name "Rita Mitsouko" originated from the combination of Catherine Ringer's childhood friend and the name of a meal they enjoyed in a local Japanese restaurant soon after they met.

According to the French Wikipedia the name of the group was chosen to reflect the band's extremely diverse musical reference: Rita refers to the South American music (and the iconic actress Rita Hayworth). Mitsouko is the French spelling of the Japanese first name Mitsuko, and is also the name of a perfume by Guerlain. The group originally went by the name "Rita Mitsouko" but in 1985 "Les" was added when they realized that many people believed the name of the group was that of the singer.

Rita Mitsouko began performing in the early 1980s in alternative spaces such as the Pali-Kao, a squatted factory building in Belleville, Paris.

The band first achieved major popular success in 1985, with the release of the second single from their first album: "Marcia baila" rose to number 2 on the French record charts that summer. Philippe Gautier directed a vibrant and widely viewed music video to accompany the record. "Marcia Baila" is an homage to the choreographer and dancer Marcia Moretto, with whom Catherine Ringer had studied and performed in the 1970s. Moretto died of cancer in 1983 at the age of 36.

Rita Mitsouko was a creative and eccentric first album, combining elements of punk, rock, synthpop and jazz. Coupled with the band's colorful, wild, over-the-top image, it brought Rita Mitsouko to the attention of some important anglophone listeners. In October 1985, they contributed a cover version of "All Tomorrow's Parties" for the Velvet Underground tribute album Les Enfants du Velvet.

The American record producer and musician Tony Visconti produced the band's next two albums, The No Comprendo and Marc et Robert, helping to polish and perfect their sound. These two albums have both French and English lyrics. The most successful singles from these albums were "C'est comme ça" ("That's the Way It Is") and "Andy".

The American band Sparks collaborated with Les Rita Mitsouko on Marc et Robert. Russell Mael sings lead vocals with Catherine Ringer on three of the album's tracks, "Singing in the Shower", "Live in Las Vegas" and "Hip Kit". "Singing in the Shower" was included on the soundtrack of the Ridley Scott film Black Rain.

Jean-Baptiste Mondino directed most of Les Rita Mitsouko's music videos in the 1980s.

Jean-Luc Godard's 1987 feature film Soigne ta droite incorporates documentary footage of the band's The No Comprendo recording sessions.

In 1991, they made the music of the movie My Life Is Hell, directed by Josiane Balasko.

In 1993, the video of "Y'a d'la haine", from the album Système D, was awarded Clip of the Year by MTV Europe.

On Système D, Ringer sings a duet, "My Love Is Bad", with Iggy Pop. Variéty also includes a vocal duo in which Ringer is joined by the guest musician Serj Tankian (from System of a Down).

Les Rita Mitsouko's album Variéty was released in 2007 in both French and in English (Variety) versions; it was produced by Mark Plati.

On Wednesday 28 November 2007, Chichin died from cancer while the band had just cancelled their previous concert dates in Paris. He had been diagnosed only two months before. Ringer toured under her own name following his death.

Discography

The discography of Les Rita Mitsouko, the French pop-rock duo, consists of seven studio albums, two compilations, one remix album, three live albums, two extended plays, twenty-seven singles, one video and twelve music videos.

Studio albums

Compilation albums

Live albums

Extended plays
 The Eye, More Variety (2007, Because Music)
 Variety Remixes (2007, Because Music)

Singles

Videos
 8 Clips Et 2 Films (1995)

Music videos

Awards
 1987 : Grand Prix of the Charles-Cros Academy
 1987 : Victoires De La Musique: "Best Album of the Year" for The no comprendo
 1987 : Victoires De La Musique: "Best Video of the Year" for "C'est comme ça"
 1990 : Prix Val Rock, for the video "Le Petit Train"
 1990 : Bus d'Acier of the decade for their collected work
 1994 : MTV Europe Music Awards: "Best video of the Year" for "Y'a d'la haine"
 2001 : Prix Roger-Seiller for "Best French Band" (SACEM Prix de Printemps)

References

External links

 Official Les Rita Mitsouko website 
 Biography of Les Rita Mitsouko, from Radio France Internationale
 Extensive Rita Mitsouko fanpage with many images 
 MySpace page
 :fr:Les Rita Mitsouko#Biographie Wikipedia page in French with more links
 Video to "Ding Dang Dong"

French pop music groups
French dance music groups
Married couples
French new wave musical groups
20th-century squatters
Because Music artists
French musical duos
Male–female musical duos